Så mörk är natten i midvintertid is a Saint Lucy song, originally entitled Lucia, with lyrics by Johny Johansson and music by Carl Bertil Agnestig. The song was originally published in 1969, and has become a popular Saint Lucy song throughout Sweden.

Publication
Julens önskesångbok, 1997, under the lines "Advent".

Recordings
An early recording was done by Söderbärke ungdomskör on the 1976 album Luciamorgon på Carl Larsson-gården.

References

1969 songs
Swedish songs
Swedish-language songs